Korie Homan and Esther Vergeer defeated Daniela Di Toro and Lucy Shuker in the final, 6–1, 6–3 to win the inaugural ladies' doubles wheelchair tennis title at the 2009 Wimbledon Championships. It was their third step towards an eventual Grand Slam, and they each completed the career Super Slam with the win.

Seeds

  Korie Homan /  Esther Vergeer (champions)
  Florence Gravellier /  Jiske Griffioen (semifinals)

Draw

Finals

External links
Draw

Women's Wheelchair Doubles
Wimbledon Championship by year – Wheelchair women's doubles